The 1928 College Basketball All-Southern Team consisted of basketball players from the South chosen at their respective positions.

All-Southerns

Guards
Ary Phillips, Ole Miss
Dewitt Laird, Ole Miss

Forwards
Cary Phillips, Ole Miss
Jelly Akin, Auburn

Center
Frank Dubose, Auburn

Key
Picked by four members of the Atlanta Journal staff.

References

All-Southern